Ronald Cochran Everhart (born January 11, 1962) is an American college basketball coach who is currently an assistant coach at West Virginia University.  Born in Fairmont, West Virginia, he was previously head coach at Duquesne University, Northeastern University and McNeese State University.

Career
Everhart took over as head coach of the Duquesne Dukes basketball team on March 29, 2006. Growing up less than 100 miles from the campus, Everhart watched Duquesne basketball frequently. In his first two seasons at Duquesne, he took a team that had won only three games the season prior to his arrival to 10 wins in 2006–07 and 17 in 2007–08. Everhart had previously turned around programs at both McNeese State and Northeastern.

In 2008–09, the Dukes made even more strides under Everhart, their signature performance coming in an upset win over #9 Xavier on February 7, 2009, Duquesne's biggest win in years. The sellout crowd stormed the court following the game. In his third season at Duquesne, he led the Dukes to the Atlantic 10 championship game. The Dukes lost the game 69–64, but earned an NIT bid, marking Duquesne's first postseason tournament since the 1994 NIT.

He was fired on March 22, 2012, following the completion of his sixth season as coach of the Dukes. On May 14, 2012, Everhart was named an assistant coach at his home-state West Virginia University under Hall of Fame coach and close friend Bob Huggins.

Head coaching record

References

External links
 West Virginia profile
 Duquesne profile

1962 births
Living people
Basketball coaches from West Virginia
Basketball players from West Virginia
College men's basketball head coaches in the United States
DeMatha Catholic High School alumni
Duquesne Dukes men's basketball coaches
Georgia Tech Yellow Jackets men's basketball coaches
McNeese Cowboys basketball coaches
Northeastern Huskies men's basketball coaches
Sportspeople from Fairmont, West Virginia
Tulane Green Wave men's basketball coaches
Virginia Tech Hokies men's basketball players
VMI Keydets basketball coaches
American men's basketball coaches
American men's basketball players